This list of museums in the state of Vorarlberg, Austria contains museums which are defined for this context as institutions (including nonprofit organizations, government entities, and private businesses) that collect and care for objects of cultural, artistic, scientific, or historical interest and make their collections or related exhibits available for public viewing. Also included are non-profit art galleries and university art galleries.

The list

References 
 Museums of Vorarlberg 
 Map of museums in Vorarlberg 
 List of museums in the Bregenz Forest

 
Voarlberg
Local museums in Austria
Vorarlberg